"Points of Authority" is a song by American rock band Linkin Park. It is the fourth track on their first studio album, Hybrid Theory. Mike Shinoda's verses originally had different lyrics, and Chester Bennington's parts became no different from the Hybrid Theory version. The song was released in 2001 as a promo release. A CD single for the song was set to be released in the UK in September 2001, but instead, "Papercut" was released as the third single from the album. It was later planned as the fifth official single from the album, planned for a January 2002 release but was cancelled for unknown reasons. In its place, the song's remix version was released.

The song's remix "Pts.OF.Athrty" was released as the only single taken from remix album Reanimation (2002) while another remix, by The Crystal Method, was released on LP Underground 2.0. The song is one from the seven Linkin Park's songs that appeared in the mash-up EP Collision Course with American rapper Jay-Z. If the Linkin Park package is downloaded on DJ Hero 2, then players (as DJs) can play with a scratched version of "Pts.OF.Athrty". The song was used in the 2000 Adam Sandler film Little Nicky.

Live info 
Between 2007 and 2009, it was performed at the beginning and the end with an intro/outro rap from another song; for example, "Petrified" and "Dolla" by Fort Minor; "It's Goin' Down" by The X-Ecutioners; and "Reading My Eyes", "High Voltage" and "Dedicated" by Linkin Park. One example appears on the band's DVD Road to Revolution: Live at Milton Keynes, as Shinoda performs "Petrified" in the beginning, and "There They Go" at the end.

Music video 
The music video was directed by Nathan "Karma" Cox, and it was released in promoting the DVD Frat Party at the Pankake Festival. It shows live presentations by Linkin Park during their tour in 2001.

An alternative video was also released as hidden content in the DVD Frat Party at the Pankake Festival. It was similar to the live version release of "Crawling," recorded at the Dragon Festival in San Bernardino, California on February 3, 2001.

As of December 2022, the music video for "Points of Authority" has over 36 million views on YouTube.

Track listing

In other media 
 A demo of the song, entitled "Oh No", appears on LP Underground X: Demos.
 A demo of the song with slightly altered lyrics appears on LP Underground 12.0.

Pts.OF.Athrty

A remix of "Points of Authority", titled "Pts.OF.Athrty", was released as a single from their remix album, Reanimation. The single features remixes of the Hybrid Theory tracks "Points of Authority", "High Voltage" and "By Myself".

"Points of Authority" was remixed by Jay Gordon from Orgy, "High Voltage" was remixed by Evidence featuring Pharoahe Monch, and "By Myself" was remixed by Marilyn Manson. The remixes of "Points of Authority" and "High Voltage" are the same as those found on the standard release of Reanimation, while the remix of "By Myself" is a different version found only on the physical single, the Japanese version and on iTunes as a bonus track.

There is also an alternate version of Jay Gordon's remix, which surfaced on a Jay Gordon remix page in 2008. It is now known that this version is a demo of the song.

There are two different endings to the song: on the album, the song holds out the long note and plays a reversed sample of "In the End", which leads up to "Enth E Nd". On the music video, the long note cuts off.

Track listing

Music video
This remix of "Points of Authority" is renowned for its video, a completely CGI battle between robots, ruled by the heads of Linkin Park members, and an alien race. The heads of all six Linkin Park members are kept in a digital lab equipped with computers and advanced equipment which can be seen extracting something from the heads as Chester Bennington and Mike Shinoda sing. According to Mr. Hahn, the band members' heads are powering the world. At the very end of the video, the commander of the alien race tries to battle the blue tentacles that were released by the members' heads, but gets his gun ripped out of his hand, and is enveloped by them.

As of December 2022, the music video for "Pts.Of.Athrty" has over 11 million views on YouTube.

Director Joe Hahn explained that the events of the video took place after the end of the human race and all that's left are the heads of the six Linkin Park members. The video is also said to have been inspired by the dream sequences in the 2001 film Final Fantasy: The Spirits Within. The music video was aired on Cartoon Network's Toonami block as a commercial break (around the year 2002). There is also a video for "Points of Authority" from Hybrid Theory which contains footage of the band playing live. It is featured on the DVD Frat Party at the Pankake Festival.

Another video features the live performance of "Points of Authority" from Linkin Park's live album Live in Texas. The Live in Texas version is available on iTunes, along with Lying from You. The "Points of Authority" video was not officially uploaded on YouTube by Linkin Park or Warner Bros. Records. It is available exclusively on Linkinpark.com. The "Pts.OF.Athrty" music video is available on both Linkin Park  and Warner Bros. Records  YouTube Channels.

iTunes
Out of the music videos for Points of Authority, Frgt/10, Enth E Nd and Kyur4 Th Ich, only Pts.of.Athrty and Frgt/10 are available on iTunes as videos (Pts.of.Athrty available in United States and Canada, Frgt/10 available in Canada Only).

Weekly charts

Year-end charts

Certifications

Credits

Linkin Park
Chester Bennington – lead vocals
Mike Shinoda – co-vocals; keyboards, programming, samples
Brad Delson – guitar; bass guitar 
Joe Hahn – turntables; samples, synthesizers
Rob Bourdon – drums

Production
Don Gilmore – engineering
Steve Sisco – engineering
John Ewing Jr. – additional engineering, Pro Tools
Matt Griffin – engineering assistance
Andy Wallace – mixing
Brian Gardner – audio mastering, digital editing
Jeff Blue – executive producer

References

External links
Pts.Of.Athrty official lyrics
By Myself official lyrics
Points of Authority official music video (FLV File)
Pts.Of.Athrty remix music video (FLV File)

Linkin Park songs
2000 songs
2001 singles
2002 singles
Songs written by Mike Shinoda
Warner Records singles
Nu metal songs
Industrial metal songs